Jordan Lee Holloway (born June 13, 1996) is an American professional baseball pitcher in the Chicago Cubs organization. He made his MLB debut in 2020 for the Miami Marlins.

Career

Amateur career
Holloway attended Ralston Valley High School in Arvada, Colorado. As a senior, he went 6–1 with a 2.60 ERA with fifty strikeouts in 43 innings, earning himself a spot on the Denver Post All-Colorado team. After his senior year, he was drafted by the Miami Marlins in the 20th round of the 2014 MLB draft. He signed with Miami, forgoing his commitment to play college baseball at the University of Nebraska Omaha.

Miami Marlins
After signing, Holloway made his professional debut with the Gulf Coast League Marlins where he pitched to a 1–3 record with a 6.41 ERA in ten games (six starts). In 2015, he began the year with the Greensboro Grasshoppers before being reassigned to the Batavia Muckdogs, with whom he was named a New York-Penn League All-Star. In 14 starts for Batavia, he went 5–6 with a 2.91 ERA. He spent 2016 with both Greensboro and Batavia, compiling a combined 2–7 record and 6.19 ERA over 13 starts between the two teams, and in 2017, he pitched for Greensboro where he went 1–2 with a 5.22 ERA in 11 starts, In 2018, he pitched only  innings due to injury.

The Marlins added him to their 40-man roster after the 2018 season. He spent 2019 with the Jupiter Hammerheads and earned Florida State League All-Star honors. Over 21 starts, he went 4–11 with a 4.45 ERA, striking out 93 over 95 innings.

Holloway made the Opening Day roster in 2020, and made his major league debut on July 26 against the Philadelphia Phillies, and pitched a scoreless 1/3 inning. His rookie campaign consisted of his only appearance. In 2021, Holloway appeared in 13 games for Miami, logging a 2-3 record and 4.00 ERA with 36 strikeouts in 36.0 innings pitched. 

Most of Holloway’s season in 2022 was spent with the Triple-A Jacksonville Jumbo Shrimp. He made one sole appearance for the big league club, allowing one run in 2 2/3 innings against the Cincinnati Reds. He elected free agency on November 10, 2022.

Chicago Cubs
On January 23, 2023, Holloway signed a minor league contract with the Chicago Cubs organization.

References

External links

1996 births
Living people
People from Arvada, Colorado
Baseball players from Colorado
Major League Baseball pitchers
Miami Marlins players
Gulf Coast Marlins players
Batavia Muckdogs players
Greensboro Grasshoppers players
Jupiter Hammerheads players
Jacksonville Jumbo Shrimp players